The Texas Centennial half dollar commemorative coin was minted to honor the Centennial of Texas's independence from Mexico. Early in the administration of President Franklin Delano Roosevelt, on June 15, 1933, Congress passed an act to authorize the coinage of silver half dollars "in commemoration of the one hundredth anniversary in 1936 of the independence of Texas, and of the noble and heroic sacrifices of her pioneers, whose revered memory has been an inspiration to her sons and daughters during the past century." This was the first of over two dozen commemorative bills that would become reality during Roosevelt's tenure. The legislation provided that "no more than one and a half million pieces" be created on behalf of the American Legion Texas Centennial Committee, located in Austin in that state.

The coin was designed by Pompeo Coppini, a Texan. The obverse depicts an Eagle sitting on a branch in front of the Lone Star, the symbol of Texas. At the top right of the star it reads IN GOD WE TRUST, and to the left of the star it reads E PLURIBUS UNUM. Over the star it reads UNITED STATES OF AMERICA, and at the bottom it reads HALF DOLLAR. The reverse depicts the goddess Victory spreading her wings over the Alamo. It also depicts Sam Houston on her left and Stephen F. Austin on her right. The Six Flags of Texas fly above her head. Under her it reads REMEMBER THE ALAMO. Over Sam Houston, Victory, and Stephen F. Austin it reads THE TEXAS INDEPENDENCE CENTENNIAL. This coin was minted from 1934 to 1938.

Mints
The Texas Centennial Half Dollar was minted in Philadelphia, Denver, and San Francisco. The mint mark for the Denver (D) and San Francisco (S) issues appears on the reverse (back) under Victory above the word THE. Philadelphia issues do not have a mint mark.

There was a total of about 304,000 coins minted, eventually 154,522 were melted by the U.S. Treasury. The numbers that are in parenthesis are the number of coins after the Treasury melted them.

See also

 Early United States commemorative coins
 Half dollar (United States coin)

References
Texas Centennial Half Dollar

Currencies introduced in 1934
Early United States commemorative coins
Fifty-cent coins
United States silver coins
Works by Pompeo Coppini
Eagles on coins
Sam Houston
Flags on coins